Warren Barguil (born 28 October 1991) is a French cyclist, who rides for UCI ProTeam . He is best known for winning two mountain stages and the mountains classification of the 2017 Tour de France.

Career

Early career
He won stage 8 of the Tour de l'Avenir, and finished 5th overall, riding for the French national team. This was a successful season for the cyclist, as he won the Tour de l'Avenir and was second overall in the Tour des Pays de Savoie.

Argos–Shimano (2013–2017)
For the 2013 season, Barguil joined the team as a regular rider, and booked his largest victories up to that point of his career, when he won stages 13 and 16 of the Vuelta a España. Barguil took no other wins this season, but placed 4th in the Rund um Köln and 8th in the Grand Prix d'Ouverture La Marseillaise.

2014 season
The first top 10 result of Barguil's 2014 season came at La Drôme Classic where he finished 8th. One week after that, he finished 8th again, this time in Strade Bianche. His first overall top 10 finish in a major stage race came at the Volta a Catalunya where he finished in 9th position. Barguil wanted to race the Tour de France, but the team wanted Barguil to do the Vuelta a España once again, but to focus on the general classification. Barguil finished in 8th position overall at the Vuelta a España, with his best stage result coming on Stage 20 with a 6th position atop the Puerto Ancares. He took his form with him to China, where he raced the Tour of Beijing, and finished in 6th position overall.

2015 season
The 2015 season was the first season with Barguil's main focus on the Tour de France. Barguil struggled with fitness during the spring season, but finished 12th in the Tour de Suisse as his warm up race for the Tour de France. One week after the Tour de Suisse, he finished 4th at the French National Road Race Championships. Barguil opened the Tour de France with a great first week, finishing 13th atop the Mûr-de-Bretagne and was in 8th position overall after that stage. He struggled in the third week, and dropped out of top 10 in the last few stages; he ended up finishing his first Tour de France in 14th overall.

2016 season

On 23 January 2016, Barguil was one of the six members of the  who were hit by a car which drove into on-coming traffic while they were training in Spain. All riders were in stable condition.

Barguil finished in 6th position in the Liège–Bastogne–Liège one-day classic. In the mid-week leading up to "La Doyenne" he finished in 9th position in La Flèche Wallonne. Barguil finished 3rd on Stage 7 of the Tour de Suisse to Sölden, and therefore took the yellow leader's jersey before heading in to the last two stages. He lost the lead the following day however, due to his 21st position in the stage eight individual time trial. Barguil showed excellent form at the start of the Tour de France, and was 4th overall at his best in the first week. However, during the race his form dropped, and he ended up finishing 23rd overall. He went to the Olympic Games but abandoned the road race. He also abandoned the Vuelta a España on Stage 3. His best result at the fall classics was 8th at Il Lombardia.

2017 season

Barguil finished 8th overall at Paris–Nice, and later went on to finish 6th in La Flèche Wallonne during the spring campaign. After a crash during the Tour de Romandie, Barguil fractured his pelvis. He was ruled out for some weeks before making his comeback at Critérium du Dauphiné where he had no success. Barguil took the polka dot jersey after Stage 9 of the Tour de France; he was beaten into second position by a whisker at the stage's finishing line in Chambéry by Rigoberto Urán in a thrilling photo finish. He won Stage 13 in a sprint finish from a four-man breakaway in Foix, beating Nairo Quintana, Alberto Contador and Mikel Landa; that was the first Tour de France stage win of his career and made him the first Frenchman to win a Tour de France stage on Bastille Day since David Moncoutié's Stage 12 victory in 2005. After his Stage 18 win, Barguil had an insurmountable 89-point lead over second-placed Primož Roglič at the top of the mountains classification.

Barguil was thrown out the Vuelta a España by  prior to Stage 8. He was 13th in the general classification after the end of Stage 7, 1:43 behind the general classification leader Chris Froome. The reasons given by Team Sunweb for Barguil's ejection from the race were: his disagreement with the team over race goals and tactics; he wanted a free role to work for himself in the mountain stages and that this had created several disagreements within the team, and his refusal to obey team orders by not waiting for Wilco Kelderman, after he had a punctured tyre on stage 7 and lost time as a result of it.

Fortuneo–Samsic (2018–present)

2018 season
For the 2018 season, Barguil joined UCI Professional Continental team , signing a three-year contract with the French team. Barguil opened his season at the Tour La Provence, and finished 32nd overall. His first World Tour race of the season was Paris–Nice where he finished 17th overall. A few weeks later he finished 15th overall at the Volta a Catalunya. At the Critérium du Dauphiné he attacked on stage 6 but was later brought back by the group of race favourites. At the Tour de France, Barguil made his first attack on the first mountain stage but it was without any luck. On the following two stages, he went into the breakaway and collected points for the polka dot jersey. He finished 2nd overall in the Mountains classification and 17th overall in the race. His first top 10 result of the year came, at the Deutschland Tour where he finished 6th overall. His best result at the season was in September where he rode Grand Prix de Wallonie and finished 3rd.

2019 season
After a rough beginning to 2019, Barguil won the French National Road Race Championships, in a sprint finish. He had previously considered retiring from the sport due to his lack of success. Barguil entered the Tour de France as usual, again with the goal of getting stage wins. He attacked on several mountain stages, showing good form, but was unable to win any stages. He did however finish 10th overall.

Major results

2009
 1st  Road race, National Junior Road Championships
 4th Tour de Vallées
 8th Overall Le Trophée Centre Morbihan
2010
 3rd La Melrandaise
2011
 4th Overall Coupe des nations Ville Saguenay
 5th Overall Tour de l'Avenir
1st Stage 8
 8th Paris–Tours Espoirs
 10th Overall Tour de l'Ain
2012
 1st  Overall Tour de l'Avenir
1st  Points classification
1st  Mountains classification
1st Stage 4
 2nd Overall Tour des Pays de Savoie
1st  Points classification
1st  Mountains classification
1st  Young rider classification
1st Stage 2
 2nd Paris–Tours Espoirs
 3rd Overall Tour Alsace
1st  Young rider classification
2013
 Vuelta a España
1st Stages 13 & 16
 4th Rund um Köln
 8th Grand Prix d'Ouverture La Marseillaise
 9th Amstel Curaçao Race
2014
 6th Overall Tour of Beijing
 8th Overall Vuelta a España
 8th La Drôme Classic
 8th Strade Bianche
 9th Overall Volta a Catalunya
2015
 4th Road race, National Road Championships
 8th International Road Cycling Challenge
 9th Clásica de San Sebastián
 9th Grand Prix Cycliste de Québec
2016
 3rd Overall Tour de Suisse
 6th Liège–Bastogne–Liège
 8th Giro di Lombardia
 9th La Flèche Wallonne
 10th Milano–Torino
2017
 6th La Flèche Wallonne
 8th Overall Paris–Nice
 10th Overall Tour de France
1st  Mountains classification
1st Stages 13 & 18
 Combativity award Stage 9 & Overall
2018
 3rd Grand Prix de Wallonie
 6th Overall Deutschland Tour
 10th Coppa Sabatini
 10th Memorial Marco Pantani
2019
 1st  Road race, National Road Championships
 2nd Overall Arctic Race of Norway
 3rd La Drôme Classic
 6th Coppa Agostoni
 9th Trofeo Campos, Porreres, Felanitx, Ses Salines
 9th Trofeo Andratx–Lloseta
 9th Giro della Toscana
 10th Overall Tour de France
2020
 2nd La Drôme Classic
 4th La Flèche Wallonne
 4th Classic Sud-Ardèche
 5th Brabantse Pijl
 5th Paris–Tours
 7th Overall Route d'Occitanie
 9th Overall Critérium du Dauphiné
 9th Liège–Bastogne–Liège
2021
 1st  Overall Tour du Limousin
 2nd Grand Prix de Wallonie
 4th Road race, National Road Championships
 5th La Flèche Wallonne
 8th Overall Arctic Race of Norway
 9th Royal Bernard Drôme Classic
2022
 1st GP Miguel Induráin
 1st Stage 5 Tirreno–Adriatico
 3rd Brabantse Pijl
 4th Road race, National Road Championships
 7th Vuelta a Murcia
 7th Clásica Jaén Paraíso Interior
 8th Faun-Ardèche Classic
 8th Trofeo Serra de Tramuntana
 9th La Flèche Wallonne
 9th La Drôme Classic
 10th Grand Prix Cycliste de Québec
 10th Grand Prix Cycliste de Montréal
 10th Grand Prix de Wallonie
  Combativity award Stage 11 Tour de France
2023
 9th Clásica Jaén Paraíso Interior

General classification results timeline

Classics results timeline

Major championships timeline

References

External links

 
 
 

1991 births
Living people
People from Hennebont
French male cyclists
French Vuelta a España stage winners
French Tour de France stage winners
Cyclists at the 2016 Summer Olympics
Olympic cyclists of France
Sportspeople from Morbihan
Cyclists from Brittany